Todd Huntley Baron is an American gastroenterologist who is Professor of Medicine at the University of North Carolina School of Medicine. Additionally, he currently serves as the Director of Advanced Therapeutic Endoscopy within UNC's Division of Gastroenterology and Hepatology. He is known for his publishing in the field of gastroenterology particularly in endoscopic retrograde cholangiopancreatography (ERCP), endoscopic ultrasound (EUS) and other advanced endoscopic procedures. He has developed interventional endoscopic techniques for the care of patients with gastrointestinal, liver and other medical conditions. He was the first to describe endoscopic drainage of the gallbladder, placement of a colonic stent, and endoscopic pancreatic necrosectomy.

Early life
Baron was born in Danbury, Connecticut in 1960, but was raised in South Florida from an early age. At the age of nine he entered competitive kart racing where he won numerous Florida State and Regional racing Championships and eventually won two International Kart Federation Grand National Championships.

Medical career
Baron completed both his undergraduate and medical degrees from the University of Florida in Gainesville, Florida. He completed his internal medicine residency, chief residency and gastroenterology fellowship at the University of Alabama at Birmingham. He completed additional training at Duke University in ERCP before joining the faculty at the University of Alabama at Birmingham, where he founded the ERCP program. He was recruited to the Mayo Clinic in Rochester, Minnesota where he became the director of pancreaticobiliary endoscopy. In 2014 he joined the faculty at the University of North Carolina as a professor of medicine and director of advanced therapeutic endoscopy.

Achievements
 First to describe endoscopic drainage of the gallbladder
 First to describe placement of an expandable metal stent for the treatment of colonic obstruction
 First to describe endoscopic pancreatic necrosectomy
 First to describe drainage of a pelvic abscess through the rectum using a flexible endoscope

Honors and awards

 Alpha Omega Alpha Honor Society, postgraduate award 1987
 Master Endoscopy Award, American Society for Gastrointestinal Endoscopy 2010
 Henry S. Plummer Distinguished Physician Award, Mayo Clinic 2012
 Past President, of Society of Gastrointestinal Intervention

References 

American gastroenterologists
Living people
University of Florida alumni
Year of birth missing (living people)